Akkihebbal Ramaiah (Ravi) Ravishankara ForMemRS FAAAS FRSC is a scientist specializing in Chemistry and Atmospheric Sciences, and University Distinguished Professor in the Departments of Chemistry and Atmospheric Sciences at Colorado State University, Fort Collins. 

He has been a leading researcher on the chemistry of the atmosphere with special focus on stratospheric ozone depletion, climate change, and air quality. His contributions have been significant in understanding ozone layer depletion, the role chemically active species play in climate change and the lifecycle of pollutants, specifically hydrofluorocarbons (HFCs) and chlorofluorocarbons (CFCs). He was part of the assessment steering committee (2006) of and co-chaired (2010 and 2014) the World Meteorological Organization (WMO)/United Nations Environment Programme (UNEP) Science Assessment Panel on Stratospheric Ozone.

Education
Ravishankara was born in Shimoga, India in 1949. He obtained his BSc and MSc degrees at the University of Mysore, and briefly researched at the Indian Institute of Science, before moving to the University of Florida at Gainesville where he received his PhD in 1975.

Career and research
Ravishankara's work included fundamental research on chemical processes and reaction rates in the gas-phase and surface chemistry of the atmosphere of Earth, resulting in better comprehension of ozone depletion, climate change and air pollutants.

Ravishankara began his career in atmospheric research after obtaining his Doctorate. He has researched Ozone Layer Depletion at Georgia Institute of Technology and in Antarctica. He participated in efforts to find alternatives to CFCs after the passing of the Montreal Protocol in 1987. His work on fully fluorinated greenhouse gases contributed to the Kyoto Protocol agreement in 1997 to reduce carbon dioxide emissions. Ravishankara has also researched extensively on HFCs, work that was part of the efforts leading to the passage of the Montreal Protocol’s 2016 Kigali Amendment, aimed at reducing the use of HFCs specifically.

In 2004, an NOAA team headed by Ravishankara, and two other independent teams, published a significant update of the rate coefficients for airborne chemical reactions. Earlier values were resulting in inaccurate measurement of, amongst other processes, atomic Oxygen reactions, created by the break-down of Ozone. Using laser flash photolysis, the groups studied the reaction kinetics of atomic oxygen with oxygen, nitrogen and hydrogen molecules as well as greenhouse gases. Results indicated that the actual rate coefficient values were 20 percent higher than the estimates used by International Union of Pure and Applied Chemistry (IUPAC) and NASA at the time.

Following research conducted by a team led by him, Ravishankara also drew attention in 2009 to the threat of nitrous oxide to the Ozone layer. In a paper published by the team in Science magazine, their research indicated a steady rise in nitrous oxide emissions by processes arising from human activity like agricultural fertilization and fossil fuel combustion.

Ravishankara was senior scientist and then director of the National Oceanic and Atmospheric Administration (NOAA)'s Chemical Sciences Division in Boulder, Colorado. He also served on the Physical Sciences jury for the Infosys Prize from 2017 to 2019.

Appointments held
His appointments held include:
1976		Research Associate, University of Maryland
1976-1985	Research positions at Georgia Institute of Technology
1979-1985	Head of Molecular Sciences Branch, Georgia Institute of Technology
1984-2014	Research positions at National Oceanic and Atmospheric Administration (NOAA)
1989-2014	Adjunct Professor of Chemistry, University of Colorado
1993-2007	Chief of Atmospheric Chemical Kinetics Program, NOAA
2006-2014	Acting Director and then Director, Chemical Sciences Division, NOAA
2014-2016	Professor of Chemistry and Atmospheric Science, Colorado State University - Fort Collins

Awards and honors
His awards and honors include:
1995	Silver Medal, United States Department of Commerce
1996	Stratospheric Ozone Protection Award of the US Environmental Protection Agency
1997	Fellow, American Geophysical Union
1998	Polanyi Medal of the Royal Society of Chemistry
1999	Robertson Memorial Lecturer, US National Academy of Sciences
2000	Member, US National Academy of Sciences
2001	Fellow, American Association for the Advancement of Science
2003	Crawford Lecture, University of Minnesota
2003	Centenary Lecture, Royal Society of Chemistry
2004	US Presidential Rank Meritorious Award for a senior professional
2005	Award for Creative Advances in Environmental Sciences, American Chemical Society
2005	Chancellor Lecturer, Louisiana State University
2005	Fellow of the Royal Society of Chemistry (FRSC)
2007	Bronze Medal, United States Department of Commerce
2008	Bronze Medal, United States Department of Commerce
2008	Administrator’s Award, National Oceanic and Atmospheric Administration 
2008	Fellow, International Union of Pure and Applied Chemistry
2008	Centenary Lecturer, Indian Institute of Science
2009	Welch Foundation Lecturer, Texas
2009	Morino Foundation Fellow, Japan
2010	Hinshelwood Lecturer, University of Oxford
2008	Bronze Medal, United States Department of Commerce
2013	Harold Schiff Lecture, York University, Canada
2013	Randall Lecture, University of Texas at Arlington, Texas
2019	Elected a Foreign Member of the Royal Society (ForMemRS)

References 

1949 births
Living people
Foreign Members of the Royal Society
Fellows of the American Geophysical Union
Members of the United States National Academy of Sciences
Fellows of the American Association for the Advancement of Science
Fellows of the Royal Society of Chemistry